Neoguri ( lit. Raccoon dog) is a brand of ramyun produced by Nongshim in South Korea since 1982. It is exported to over 80 countries, and is the fourth highest selling brand of noodles in South Korea. It is well known for its thick noodles and its spicy seafood flavour. The Korean version has a big piece of kombu, while the U.S. version does not have the kombu in it.

Types of Neoguri 
Mild 
Hot
Stir-fry
62 g cup
75 g cup
Neoguri Big Bowl
Neoguri Mild Big Bowl
Neoguri Stir-fry Big Bowl

In popular culture 
In the Academy Award-winning South Korean film Parasite one of the characters prepares a dish called Chapaguri (짜파구리) or "ram-don", a portmanteau which combines Neoguri with a second instant noodle product, the jajangmyeon-based Chapagetti (짜파게티).

See also

 List of noodles
 List of instant noodle brands

References

External links

Neoguri - Nongshim 

South Korean brands
Instant noodle brands